

The Briegleb BG-08 was a 1940s two-seat glider designed by William G. Briegleb.

Development
The BG-08 was a high-wing tandem two-seat glider with a steel-tube-and-fabric fuselage, wooden wings with fabric covering and a metal-and-fabric tail. The type certificate was approved on 31 December 1942.

The glider was built by Briegleb's company, the Sailplane Corporation of America. Three gliders were impressed into service with the United States Army Air Forces in 1942.

Variants
BG-08
Company designation
XTG-13
United States Army Air Corps designation for one BG-8 which was impressed as training glider in 1942.
TG-13
United States Army Air Corps designation for two BG-8s which were impressed as training gliders in 1942.

Operators

United States Army Air Corps

See also
Briegleb El Mirage Airfield

References

Notes

Bibliography

1940s United States sailplanes
Glider aircraft
BG-08